Come Shine is a Norwegian jazz band, established 2001 in Trondheim.

Biography
Their eponymously titled debut album was released in 2001 on Curling Legs, and was followed by a later studio album, Do Do That Voodoo, and a live album, Come Shine with the Norwegian Radio Orchestra in Concert.

Come Shine has a long history at the Kongsberg Jazz Festival, where they this summer again is on the playlist. They also played at the Norwegian National Jazz Scene, Victoria, in Oslo.

Personnel
Erlend Skomsvoll - piano
Håkon Mjåset Johansen - drums
Sondre Meisfjord - bass
Live Maria Roggen - vocals

Discography

Albums
2001: Come Shine (Curling Legs)
2002: Do Do That Voodoo (Curling Legs)
2003: Come Shine with the Norwegian Radio Orchestra in Concert (Curling Legs)
2014: Red and Gold (Jazzland)
2016: Norwegian Caravan(Lawoo Classics)

References

External links

Come Shine - a peek from the Opera on YouTube

Norwegian jazz ensembles
Spellemannprisen winners
Musical groups with year of establishment missing 
Musical groups from Norway with local place of origin missing
Jazzland Recordings (1997) artists
Curling Legs artists